Stefan Mlyakov (born 22 September 1971) is a Bulgarian archer. He competed in the men's individual event at the 1996 Summer Olympics.

References

External links
 

1971 births
Living people
Bulgarian male archers
Olympic archers of Bulgaria
Archers at the 1996 Summer Olympics
People from Gabrovo